"A Star Is Torn" is the eighteenth episode of the sixteenth season of the American animated television series The Simpsons. It first aired on the Fox network in the United States on May 8, 2005. Fantasia Barrino guest stars as Clarissa Wellington.

Plot
After being unable to shop at the Kwik-E-Mart because it is being held up, Lisa suggests the Simpsons have a vegetarian meal with ingredients purchased from a nearby stall, which they enjoy until Bart, Homer, Marge, and Maggie feel queasy and begin vomiting. Because she is a vegetarian, Lisa is immune to the "vitamins, minerals, and trace amounts of bug feces". Lisa points out that the rest of them are so used to processed foods that their bodies were not prepared for organic foods. As the family sits on the couch, wrapped in blankets, Lisa feeds them dry toast, and gently sings them to sleep with the "Hush, Little Baby" song. The next morning, the family is feeling better, eating fried chicken while watching TV. They see Krusty make an endorsement for his "Li'l Starmaker" competition, a children's American Idol-style competition where the winner shall be animated in an episode of Itchy & Scratchy. Bart convinces Lisa to enter because he believes she has a great voice.

At the competition, another child (played by guest star Fantasia Barrino) sings a perfect version of Lisa's planned song, "Hush, Little Baby" which is declared by Bart to sound like "Whitney Houston brought to life". Lisa starts to panic, but Homer comes to her rescue by going to the nearby music store and writing a song for her to sing. She sings the song "I'm Talking Springfield", which praises Springfield (except Ned Flanders), delighting the crowd. Soon, the competition enters its knockout stages. Homer, now Lisa's manager, starts using every means at his disposal to make Lisa feel comfortable. He even gets her the right spotlight by beating up the technician.

The competition progresses and contestants are eliminated, leaving just fan favorites Cameron and Lisa in the final to take place the next week. However, Homer's aggressive treatment of staff at the competition makes Lisa mad. As a result, Lisa fires him as her manager, causing him to be upset. Later that night, as the rest of the family eat dinner, Homer enters to announce that he has become Cameron's manager. Lisa is sad that Homer is upset with her.

During the competition final, Lisa sings a song that she has written herself, called "Always My Dad", dedicated to Homer. The song expresses how much she loves her dad, and how sorry she is for hurting him. After she finishes, everyone loves it. Cameron, now restyled by Homer as "Johnny Rainbow", then sings a rather condescending song called "Privileged Boy" that Homer wrote, the lyrics of which say how much better he is than everyone else. The audience boos Cameron and throw tomatoes at him, and he flees the stage in disgrace. Lisa is thrilled that Homer sabotaged the competition to help her win, and Homer says he will always be there for her.

During the closing credits, Homer teaches Lisa the jazz hands routine, which he taught Cameron earlier, for her next performance. Maggie joins in as well, though does stumble at first before picking up the routine.

Cultural references
Li'l Starmaker is a parody of American Idol, although the ad claims to have never heard of the latter.
 This episode draws heavily from Al Jolson's The Jazz Singer and the Broadway musical Gypsy.
 This episode's title is the same title given to the twenty-third episode of Power Rangers Dino Thunder, with both episodes sharing roughly the same plot.

External links
A Star is Torn at the Internet Movie Database

The Simpsons (season 16) episodes
2005 American television episodes
Television episodes written by Carolyn Omine